Carlton W. Fulford Jr. (born May 11, 1944) is a retired United States Marine Corps four-star general who served as Deputy Commander in Chief, United States European Command (DCINCEUR) from 2000 to 2002.

Biography
Carlton Fulford Jr. was born on May 11, 1944, in Newnan, Georgia.

Fulford graduated from the United States Naval Academy in June 1966 and following graduation received his commission as a second lieutenant in the United States Marine Corps.   Following completion of The Basic School, Marine Corps Base Quantico, and the Vietnamese Language School, he was assigned as a platoon commander with Company D, 1st Battalion, 5th Marines in the Republic of Vietnam. He was promoted to first lieutenant in October 1967, and subsequently reassigned as Commanding Officer, Company F, 2nd Battalion, 5th Marines until his return from Vietnam in June 1968.

His other Fleet Marine Force assignments include: Commanding Officer, Company E, 2nd Battalion, 4th Marines (1971–1972); Executive Officer, 3rd Battalion, 8th Marines (1979–1980); G-3 Training Officer for the 2nd Marine Division (1980–1981); Commanding Officer, 1st Battalion, 8th Marines (1981–1982); Assistant Chief of Staff G-3 for the 1st Marine Expeditionary Brigade (1987–1989); Commanding Officer, 7th Marines (1989–1991); Commanding Officer, Regimental Combat Team 7 (Task Force Ripper) during Operation Desert Shield and Desert Storm; Commanding General, 4th Marine Expeditionary Brigade (1991–1992), Commanding General, III Marine Expeditionary Force (1994–1995), and Commanding General, I Marine Expeditionary Force (1996–1998); Commander, U.S. Marine Corps Forces Pacific /Commanding General, Fleet Marine Force, Pacific/Commander, U.S. Marine Corps Bases, Pacific headquartered at Camp H. M. Smith, Hawaii (1998–1999).

His non-FMF assignments include: Company Commander, Naval Academy Preparatory School (1968–1969); Management Engineer, Marine Corps Air Station Yuma, Arizona (1973–1976); Economics Instructor, U.S. Naval Academy (1977–1978); Branch Head, Training Department, HQMC (1982–1984); Strategy Planner, Forces and Strategy Branch, United States Pacific Command (1985–1987); Commanding General, Landing Force Training Command, Atlantic (1991–1992); Director, Training and Education Division, Marine Corps Combat Development Command (1992–1994); Commanding General Marine Corps Bases, Japan (1994–1995); Vice Director, The Joint Staff (1995–1996); Director, The Joint Staff (1999–2000); and Deputy Commander in Chief, United States European Command (2000–2002).

In addition to The Basic School, Fulford graduated from the Infantry Officers Advanced Course; Command and Staff College; and the Industrial College of the Armed Forces.  Fulford also earned a Master of Science degree from Rensselaer Polytechnic Institute (1973).

Awards and decorations
His personal decorations include:

See also

List of United States Marine Corps four-star generals

Notes

References

External links

  

1944 births
Atlantic Council
Living people
United States Marine Corps generals
United States Naval Academy alumni
United States Marine Corps personnel of the Vietnam War
Recipients of the Gallantry Cross (Vietnam)
Recipients of the Legion of Merit
Recipients of the Silver Star
Rensselaer Polytechnic Institute alumni
Recipients of the Defense Distinguished Service Medal